Yashomati Maiyaa Ke Nandlala is an Indian Hindi-language drama series produced by Contiloe Entertainment. It stars Neha Sargam, Rahul Sharma and Hitanshu Jinsi in lead roles and premiered on 13 June 2022 and ended its run on 2 December 2022 on Sony Entertainment Television. It digitally streams on SonyLIV. The show suffered a time slot change from 9 PM to 8:30 PM in August 2022.

Plot 
The series is based on the childhood of Shri Krishna. As the title, it depicts the affectionate relationship between mother and son in a tale based on the Bhagavata Puran.

Cast

Main 
 Trisha Sarda as Grown Up Krishna/Kanha
 Arya as Baby Kanha/Krishna
 Neha Sargam as Yashoda
 Rahul Sharma as Nanda
 Hitanshu Jinsi as Bhagwan Vishnu

Recurring 
 Romiit Raaj as Vasudeva
 Dinesh Mehta as Bhagwan Shiva
 Reema Worah as Devi Yogmaya, Parvati, Durga, Annapurna
 Piyali Munshi as Devi Lakshmi
 Nimisha Vakharia as Purna Mashi
 Shivendraa Om Saainiyol as Upanand
 ActorsFirdaush as Villager Pandit:
 Suman Gupta as Devaki
 Ram Yashvardhan as Kans 
 Preetika Chauhan as Asti
 Neha Tiwari as Prapti 
 Gautam Suri as Indradev
 Pradeep Kabra as Asur
 Sukesh Anand
 Sukanya Surve as Rohini
 Samar Ali
 Yogesh Jadhav
 Hemant Bharati
 Rahul Dwivedi (Bhola chacha)

Productions

Release 
First teaser of the show launched on 20 March 2022 featuring Neha Dubey as Yashoda.

See also  
 List of programs broadcast by Sony Entertainment Television

References

External links 
 Yashomati Maiyaa Ka Nandlala on SonyLIV
 Yashomati Maiyaa Ke Nandlala on MX Player
 Yashomati Maiyaa Ka Nandlala on Sony Entertainment Television

2022 Indian television series debuts
Indian drama television series
Hindi-language television shows
Sony Entertainment Television original programming